The  188th Antiaircraft Artillery Battalion was  an Antiaircraft Battalion of the United States Army.

Lineage
Constituted 28 June 1955 as the 188th Antiaircraft Artillery Battalion (Automatic Weapons)(Self Propelled) and allotted to the Colorado National Guard. Organized 1 August 1955 from existing organizations as follows-
 Company C 193rd Tank Battalion (organized in the Colorado National Guard as Battery A, Field Artillery, Colorado National Guard and federally recognized 15 June 1921 at Pueblo; Redesignated 1 November 1921 as Battery A 158th Field Artillery; redesignated 1 May 1922 as Battery C 158th Field Artillery; redesignated 1 July 1926 as Battery C 168th Field Artillery Battalion (horse); redesignated 1 August 1933 as Battery C 168th Field Artillery; redesignated 1 September 1933 as Battery F 168th Field Artillery; Inducted into federal service 24 February 1941 at Pueblo; redesignated 1 March 1943 as Battery C 983rd Field Artillery Battalion; Inactivated 19 December 1945 at Camp Stoneman, California; redesignated 10 May 1946 as Company C 193rd Tank Battalion; reorganized and federally recognized 18 April 1947 at Pueblo; redesignated Company C 193rd Heavy Tank Battalion; ordered into active federal service 3 September 1950 at Pueblo; released from active federal service 2 July 1952 and resumed state status and redesignated 1 December 1952 as Company C 193rd Tank Battalion) Converted and redesignated Headquarters and Headquarters Battery
 Heavy Mortar Company 157th Infantry (Organized in the Colorado National Guard as Headquarters Battery and Combat train 1st Battalion 168th Field Artillery and federally recognized 30 April 1947 at Durango; redesignated 1 July 1940 as Headquarters Battery 1st Battalion 168th Field artillery; inducted into federal service 24 February 1941 at Durango; redesignated 1 March 1943 as Headquarters Battery 168th Field Artillery Battalion; inactivated 17 January 1946 at Camp Stoneman, California; redesignated 10 May 1946 as Cannon Company 157th Infantry; reorganized and federally recognized 12 January 1947 at Durango and redesignated 1 December 1948 as Heavy Mortar Company 157th Infantry) redesignated Battery A.
 Detachment 1, Heavy Mortar Company 157th Infantry (organized in the Colorado National Guard and federally recognized 25 May 1950 at Cortez) redesignated detachment 1, Battery A.
 Company B 199th Engineer Battalion (Organized in the Colorado National Guard as Troop D 1st Separate Squadron of Cavalry and federally recognized 7 October 1920 at Monte Vista; redesignated 1 November 1921 as Troop D 111th Cavalry; redesignated 1 February 1922 as Troop A 117th Cavalry; redesignated 26 June 1931 as Troop A 117th Separate Cavalry Squadron; Converted and redesignated 1 August 1933 as Battery D 168th Field Artillery; inducted into federal service 24 February 1941 at Monte Vista; redesignated 1 March 1943 as Battery A 983rd Field Artillery Battalion; inactivated 19 December 1945 at Camp Stoneman, Ca.; redesignated 10 May 1946 as Company D 193rd Tank Battalion; reorganized and federally recognized 19 April 1947 at Monte Vista; redesignated 1 November 1949 as Company D 193rd Heavy Tank Battalion; ordered into active federal service 3 September 1950 at Monte Vista; relieved from active federal service 1 August 1952 and resumed state status; redesignated 1 December 1952 as Company D 193rd Tank Battalion and redesignated Company B 199th Engineer Battalion in January 1955) redesignated Battery B.
 Company A 199th Engineer Battalion (Organized in the Colorado National Guard as Company A 199th Combat Engineer Battalion and federally recognized 14 November 1947 at Alamosa; ordered into federal service 11 September 1950 at Alamosa; redesignated 1 February 1953 as Company A 199th Engineer Battalion; released from federal service 17 January 1955 and resumed state status) redesignated Battery C.
 Company B 193rd Tank Battalion (Organized in the Colorado National Guard as Company B 193rd Tank Battalion and federally recognized 18 April 1947 at Pueblo; redesignated 1 November 1949 as Company B 193rd Heavy Tank Battalion; ordered into federal service 3 September 1950 at Pueblo; released from federal service 1 August 1952 and resumed state status and redesignated 1 December 1952 as Company B 193rd Tank Battalion) redesignated Battery D.
 Medical Detachment 199th Engineer Battalion (Organized in the Colorado National Guard and federally recognized 11 December 1952 at Alamosa) redesignated Medical Detachment.

Consolidated 1 February 1959 with the 157th Field Artillery, a parent regiment under the Combat Arms Regimental System

Campaign streamers
World War II
 New Guinea
 Leyte
 Luzon
 Southern Philippines

Decorations
Philippine Presidential Unit Citation, Streamer embroidered 17 OCTOBER 1944 to 4 JULY 1945 (983rd Field Artillery Battalion cited DAGO 47,1950

References

External links
 http://www.history.army.mil/html/forcestruc/lh.html 

Air defense artillery battalions of the United States Army
Military units and formations established in 1955
1955 establishments in Colorado